Other People may refer to:

 Other People (novel), by Martin Amis, 1981
 Other People (film), a 2016 American film
 The Other People, a 1968 British film
 Other People, a 2001 short film produced by Vickie Gest
 "Other People", a song by LP from Lost on You, 2016
 Other People, a 2017 album by English folk rock band The Rails